The Isku-class motor torpedo boat was a Thornycroft type motor torpedo boat of the Finnish Navy. The vessel was constructed in 1926 by the Borgå varv, in Porvoo, Finland, and she saw service in World War II. Isku differed from the original Thornycraft design through its torpedo launching method (they were released from the sides of the hull, in contrast to dropping them from the aft). However, she was not a successful design and she only participated in the Winter War and during the first months of the Continuation War. She was stricken from the navy lists in 1942, due to extensive wear damage on the hull. She was moored at Suomenlinna and was scrapped after the war.

Vessels of the class
Isku ex-MTV 3 in Finnish service.

References

Torpedo boats of the Finnish Navy
Torpedo boat classes